is a Japanese manga by . It was serialized in Enix's shōnen manga magazine Monthly GFantasy from 1999 to 2002, and Ichijinsha's josei manga magazine Monthly Comic Zero Sum from 2002 to 2019, and Ichijinsha's website  from 2019 to 2022. Its chapters were collected in 24 tankōbon volumes. The manga was published in North America by Tokyopop; only the first ten volumes were released. A ten-episode anime adaptation, Hatenkou Yugi, aired between January and March 2008 on Kyoto Broadcasting System.

Plot
A young girl named Rahzel is abruptly sent off to see the world by her eccentric, doting father. She is alone on her travels until she meets Alzeid, an attractive, mysterious loner on a mission to avenge his father's murder. After aiding Alzeid in retrieving his stolen gun from a thief, Rahzel decides to follow Alzeid promising that she would make his "lousy and boring" life "more interesting and fun!" Alzeid grudgingly acknowledges that Rahzel will be traveling with him from now on. Soon after, a womanizing acquaintance of Alzeid's named Baroqueheat joins in their adventure.

Characters

Rahzel cares a lot about fashion whereas Alzeid does not care at all. She is loud, outgoing, and very straightforward with a horrible sense of direction, but she is clever, sensible, and wise. She likes her father, tea, sweets, and chiffon, among other things; she dislikes boring things and smokers.
It is later revealed that Rahzel's mother had the ability to see the future but, mad with her powers, tried to kill her nine-year-old daughter during her birthday. In the process, Rahzel murdered her own mother and was abandoned by her real father. He drew a circle around her and left her in the middle of the woods, telling her to wait until he returned (he eventually does, but Rahzel is already gone). Rahzel had always believed that her foster father had found her in the forest at that time, but a flashback reveals that it was actually Kiara. While talking with Rahzel, Kiara established that she would belong to him (when Kiara rescued a drugged Rahzel from a burning house, he handed her to Alzeid and told him that he was only 'borrowing' Rahzel). Afterwards, Kiara delivers Rahzel to her foster father and tells him to watch over her until his return.
Apparently, Rahzel's magical abilities are very high (according to Shougetsu, she's rank B+, and he's never seen anybody who was that good) because she can incant one spell but summon an entirely different spell at the same time, as she did while fighting in Acanea. Rahzel holds a philosophy that by naming herself, she belongs to herself; in her memories, her foster father had suggested the philosophy and Rahzel had subsequently named herself. In reality, Kiara had been the one to both suggest the idea and name her, establishing her as his property.
Rahzel and Kiara only occasionally meet each other whenever Rahzel is separated from Baroqueheat and Alzeid. She always identifies him as an enemy, and he always confirms this, but Rahzel presents a strong reluctance to fight him.
After receiving wounds from Kiara that would have killed a normal human, her wounds close up at an insanely fast rate. This is when she and the ones around her realize that Rahzel is not a normal human. Rahzel then tests this theory by asking Baroqueheat and her father to see how far they could brutally hurt her until she nearly reached death. Even after getting beaten with so much force that she could have died many times over, she barely survived, and then her wounds healed, once again, at the same quick speed.
In the present story, Rahzel has been sent back to the past by the elder (but smaller) Alzeid, to where both Alzeids were still just children, and Second was still alive (and in the lab). However, Rahzel only suspects that she was sent to the past for a moment, and then brushes it off. Later on, however, she does confirm that she's in the past, and after an encounter with Enero, she realises that her actions in the past she's currently in have had influence on the future she came from.
Rahzel is in fact the one who killed Second in order to save Alzeid and his younger brother, as well as to end Second's suffering. She did so by being dragged into a time slip.

Alzeid is a twenty-four-year-old albino who joins Rahzel while on his journey to get revenge on his father's enemy, a woman who has black hair and blue eyes. He is cold and quiet but he has the greatest influence on Rahzel's actions. In his youth, his army friends used to cheat him at poker which ended up with him dressed as a girl and waiting tables. When escaping from Acanea, he was forced to dye his hair black and wear glasses as a disguise. He likes cocoa, peaches, sweets (he usually puts five teaspoons of sugar in cocoa and tea), and sleep; he dislikes mornings, baths, alarms, carrots, and green peppers. He also pouts when people are ignoring him. At the beginning of their journey together he treats Rahzel coldly as nuisance but gradually gets used to her. When Serateed decides to take Rahzel home Baroqueheat understands and agrees but Alzeid seeing that Rahzel is not opposing her father, angrily decides to go with her.
On their way to Acanea, Rahzel meets a young boy who resembles Alzeid. When she later asks him if he has a younger brother, Alzeid remarks that he has an older brother. His older brother also bears the name Alzeid (under Kiara's insistence) and is known in Acanea as the 'white-haired and red-eyed devil,' who had been committing mass murders alongside Kiara. Bounty hunters hired to eliminate him instead find Alzeid and immediately attack and poison him. When Rahzel encounter Kiara on a train, Alzeid is pitted against his brother, who hasn't aged since their childhood. Apparently, both boys were clones of Second - Alzeid was the second clone when his brother was proved to be a failure. Kiara reveals that Alzeid's brother had never been a failure and had in fact been hiding his magical ability, which was far greater than Alzeid's. The battle ends in Alzeid's defeat and his being thrown off a bridge, much to Rahzel's despair (and her foster father's delight). He does live, however, and is reunited with Heat and Rahzel.
When Alzeid meets Rahzel when he is just a child (due to time travel on Rahzel's part), he has no idea what a woman is besides the text descriptions from his books. When she is knocked out cold, he tries to drag her by her hair to bring her to his room. Because he has never learned about kindness towards women and how to treat them, he is baffled about how he should react to her.
He was about to be sacrificed by Second to become his new vessel, but Rahzel saved him by killing Second. Because Alzeid only saw her for an instant with the gun over Second's dead body, he assumed that the woman killed him. However, Rahzel was prompted by Second to kill him.

Baroqueheat (twenty-eight-years-old) is an army friend of Alzeid and Soresta. He has a butterfly tattoo, made by his deceased lover, on his right hand that turns into a sword when he needs to fight. To stir up Alzeid, he kisses Rahzel, and constantly harasses her. It seems that these actions are only to irritate Alzeid, but as the manga progresses, his feelings seem to be more like deep love, than anything else. Later he joins the two in their travels. It is revealed later in the manga series that he is not human. He is much older than he looks. He is the youngest of four children (three boys, one girl). He likes women, cigarettes, alcohol, sea food, and showers, and dislikes men. Previously he loved Natsume, and believes that Second killed her which is why he cannot reconcile his liking to Alzeid and hate to his creator - Mr. Second so he keeps calling Alzeid "Al-kiddo" or "Al-boy" but never "Alzeid". Often gives Alzeid soft scolding for harshly treating Rahzel. He tries to corner Alzeid and make him admit that he holds deep feelings for Rahzel. He was asked by Natsume in the past that after her death he'd kept taking care of Alzeid - but it is not said which Alzeid she meant (she called Second "Alzeid").

Kiara is an unknown character who keeps appearing in the manga. It is unknown if he is an ally or an enemy, however, he has said that Rahzel is "his", and that he is currently "lending" her to Alzeid. Later into the series, Kiara shows to have a played a vital role in Rahzel's past. A role that Rahzel can not seem to remember. Also, Minari Endoh stated that Kiara may have been Rahzel's first love. It is revealed that he is Baroqueheat's second older brother. Branoween has stated that Rahzel, Alzeid and Baroqueheat all have essential roles in his scenarios. He likes Natsume and Branoween; he dislikes Baroqueheat and Alzeid.
He meets Rahzel several times during her journey, always providing her strange advice while enjoying tea with her. Each time, she regards him with suspicion, and they always promise to fight during their next meeting. But whenever Kiara leaves, Rahzel is filled with despair and believes that she knows him and does not want to fight him. Though, in volume ten, he hurts her badly after putting a tranquilizing powder in her tea.
In the manga, he was the person, along with Alzeid's brother, to have discovered Rahzel in the woods (not her father, as she previously thought). Kiara brought Rahzel to her father and told him to take care of her and that he would eventually come back for her (which is why her father is so overprotective of her). When Alzeid and Baroqueheat separate from Rahzel, they stumble on her home and meet her real father and discover the truth about Rahzel's abandonment; while they persuade Rahzel not to face her father, Kiara comes to her home and kills her real father. In the anime, it is also implied that he is the one who picked Rahzel up from the forest in which she was abandoned. The reason he calls Rahzel his is because of her philosophy, that whoever names another is the other's owner- Kiara had renamed her Rahzel and subsequently 'owned' her.
When Rahzel gets sent to the past, she runs into him after being kicked out by Second. She accidentally lets the name Baroqueheat slip, which piques his interest in her, as he still does not know her yet. When Rahzel goes to her parents' house on her birthday, he accompanies her and urges her to sneak in when they notice nobody is home. There they meet baby Razenshia, who has just turned one year old. It's then revealed that Kiara knew Razenshia, because she was the only one who was recently born with the rare combination of blue eyes and black hair. After Kiara talks about parents' love for their children and how loved Razenshia is by her parents, Rahzel bitterly remarks that not all children are wanted, and Razenshia is only loved now while it's still convenient. Rahzel tells him that when things take a turn for the worse, Razenshia will surely be tossed away, to which Kiara promises her that if that ever happens, he will make sure to pick her up and wish her a happy birthday, and give her a family who will celebrate her birthday.

The other Alzeid, Alzeid's fellow clone and 'older brother' who has not aged since their childhood and retains the shape of a young boy, although he technically has no gender. Like Alzeid and their father Second, he is an albino, though his hair is longer than Alzeid's. He first appears to Rahzel on their way to Acanea, hugging her on the deck and complaining how 'that jerk' (later revealed to be Kiara) wouldn't let him see her, but how he had run away because he would smell Rahzel and wanted to be with her. He claims that Rahzel promised to name him, one time when they had taken a bath together, and wants her to hurry up and name him (mostly because Kiara calls him Alzeid, which name he hates). Before he can explain to a confused Rahzel, though, he senses his brother's approach and leaves. In Acanea, the other Alzeid and Kiara were framing Alzeid - the other Alzeid would commit mass murders and because of him and Alzeid's similar appearances. As a result, two bounty hunters seriously injure Alzeid, whom they confuse for the 'white-haired and red-eyed devil child' who had been plaguing the island (Rahzel tries to point out Alzeid's age to them, but they refuse to listen to her). While drawing poisoned, unconscious Alzeid to some clinic Rahzel meets again the other Alzeid which tells her to leave him and that "this guy" has no right to own name "Alzeid".
When he was cloned from Second, he had been deemed a failure because of the lack of reproductive organs and was replaced by the more-favored Alzeid. Because of breaking the promise of seeing the world together, the other Alzeid cultivated a grudge for his brother (which is why he hates being called Alzeid by Kiara). The other Alzeid had met Rahzel when Kiara had first found her; sometime during this meeting, Kiara had established that Rahzel was his and the other Alzeid was hers (following Rahzel's belief that by renaming herself, she owned herself). He mentions that Rahzel had promised him that she would name him. He keeps calling Rahzel "Big Sister" the same name as Four Siblings(Serateed, Kiara, Branowen and Baroqueheat) used to call Natsume. He states that in laboratory he used to play with 'Big Sis" and Alzeid in hide-and-seek. He recognized Rahzel after her smell which was the same as "Big Sister's". He and Alzeid fight on a train, while Kiara was revealing to Rahzel that older Alzeid had never been a failure and had in fact been hiding his powers, which were far greater than Alzeid's. In fact after gravely injuring Alzeid, without any scratch he easily defeats Alzeid, who has to escape from the train.
In the past, he is shown to have cared immensely for his little brother, even planning to save money and run away from the facility to protect him. He is also shown to have a heavy dislike for Taylor, though not as bad as the younger Alzeid.

Soresta is an army friend of Alzeid and Baroqueheat. He is obsessed with Alzeid in a very stalker-like fashion, such as making dolls of him, and writing poetry. In an attempt to kill Rahzel, he is killed by Alzeid. It is revealed later that he had been married to a medic named Taylor.

Vincent is a kid who is being watched by Baroqueheat and Soresta. According to the manga, he is the imposter of an illegitimate child between a king and one of his servants. The real Vincent died in the terrible sickness that killed the king and all the other heirs, leaving his servant to impersonate him and be delivered to the king. However, the anime does not mention this and simply keeps him as the illegitimate child.

Jelice is a friend of Rahzel's father and is like an older brother to Rahzel. He is an eccentric priest who was sent into seminary by his adoptive parents when they found out he had a relationship with their biological daughter. He admits that he does not believe in God, but thinks that the church serves as an important service to the people. He wears glasses even though he has 20/20 vision. He likes beer, meat, and tea; he dislikes androgynes and amphibians. His adoptive sister was left by family and after living as prostitute, murdered due to a fatal drug which was being distributed around the town, driving Jelice to murder the man who had sold the "Angel text" drug to her.

Despite her small appearance, Branowen is Baroqueheat's older sister. She dislikes Alzeid stating that she 'hates his face' but she keeps Second's glasses in remembrance of him. Baroqueheat mentioned that she is the smartest person he knows and that she is the "idol" of the family. She is skillful with tools and is some sort of mechanic. Like the other siblings, she was very attached to Second and Natsume, and dislikes Alzeid for looking like Second. She loves all of her siblings, which is why she won't choose between Baroqueheat and Kiara.

Rahzel's foster father. Also Baroqueheat, Branowen and Kiara's eldest brother. As a close friend of the late Second, he hates Alzeid for taking his name and his gun. He suspects Alzeid of killing Second and accuses him of making up the person who supposedly killed him. Of the four siblings, he is the only one who doesn't worship Natsume unconditionally. He seems to bear a grudge for her using him to test the Angel Text drug on, threatening to do it to Branowen or Kiara if he refuses, since they wouldn't refuse her. When Kiara picked Rahzel up and named her, he went to Serateed and asked him to raise and train her. Kiara then said he would one day come back to claim her, which is the reason why Serateed is so overprotective of Rahzel.
He was a close friend of Second, even after the latter supposedly killed Natsume.

She was the one who created Serateed, Kiara, Branoween and Baroqueheat. She was killed by Second, her lover. Each one who knew Natsume and Rahzel says that Rahzel looks like her. Somehow she foresaw her death. Although she was loved by the siblings, Serateed, whom she experimented on with the Angel Text drug, commented that she carried a large darkness in her heart. She was the one who gave Baroqueheat his tattoo/weapon.

Second is the original from which the two Alzeids were cloned. He seemed to have created the clones for the sole purpose of prolonging his life, though it's not yet know what exactly he was planning to do with them. He had a close relationship with Natsume, although the true nature of their relationship is still unknown. It was Natsume who gave him the nickname "Alzeid". Later on, it's revealed that that was the name she gave an albino bunny used for experimental purposes.
When Rahzel gets sent back in the past en is found by him in his residence, he initially sends her away. When she comes back to him after discovering she was sent back to the past, however, he takes her in and hires her as a live-in housekeeper. They seem to grow closer over time, and he even gives her earrings as a birthday gift, although she can't wear them, having acquired a high-speed regenerating body and non-pierced ears. She does treasure them, and wears them in her clothing instead.
Second is in fact a scientist from Earth who went to space to begin a new colony on a different planet with homuncli. For reasons unknown, he, Natsume, and the others are cut off from contacting Earth, and are forced to begin a new civilization on their new planet--the planet on which the story takes place. Natsume wants to create a family made of the same cells as Alzeid to make a family for him, but when he says he will commit suicide to stop her from doing so, she kills herself with a smile instead. Second spends 600 years trying to bring her back to life, aging in his body, creating clones of himself, and then transferring his consciousness over to a new body. He repeated this process until he encountered a time-slipping Rahzel, who made him realize the error of his ways. He prompted her to kill him and stop the cycle, saving the younger Alzeid's life.

Taylor is first introduced as a medic of a small clinic who saves Alzeid's life after he's been poisoned. She turns out to have been in the army with Alzeid and Baroqueheat, where she worked together with Solesta as medics. At some point, she married Solesta, who was later killed by Alzeid when the former tried to kill Rahzel.
In the past, Taylor had a much more innocent and insecure personality. After Rahzel gave her advice on how to choose a present for Second, she started calling Rahzel 'sensei' and admired her a lot. She was involved in Second's experiment involving his clones, or rather, the youngest clone. Perhaps because of Rahzel's influence, she seems to grow slightly attached to the clones.

Media

Manga
It was later transferred to Ichijinsha's josei manga magazine Monthly Comic Zero Sum, where it ran from 2002 to 2019, before being transferred to the web version of the magazine, where it ran from 2019 to 2022. Due to the publisher switch, the first three volumes that were out at the time were re-published by Ichijinsha and released on August 26, 2002. The 24th and final volume was released on September 24, 2022.

The manga has been licensed by Tokyopop for English language distribution in North America, and the first volume was released on January 10, 2006. They only released ten volumes, with the last one published on January 6, 2009.

Volumes

Drama CDs
Two drama CDs based on the series were released in 2004 based on the first two volumes of the manga.

Internet radio show
An Internet radio show entitled  began on December 6, 2007 hosted by Animate TV. The show is hosted by Sanae Kobayashi who plays Rahzel in the anime, and Shin-ichiro Miki who plays Baroqueheat in the anime.

Anime
A ten-episode anime television series adaptation, Hatenkou Yugi, aired on Kyoto Broadcasting System television network between January 5 and March 8, 2008.

Episodes

References

External links
Ichijinsha's website on the series 
Anime official website 

Fantasy anime and manga
Gangan Comics manga
Ichijinsha manga
Josei manga
Romance anime and manga
Shōnen manga
Sentai Filmworks
Studio Deen
Tokyopop titles